Aaron Scott Lazar is an American actor, artist and entrepreneur. He originated the role of Enjolras in the 2006 Broadway revival of Les Miserables.

He is currently starring as Dr. Neville Craven in the Los Angeles Broadway-aimed production of The Secret Garden.

Early life and education
Lazar was born in Cherry Hill, New Jersey. Lazar is of Jewish descent. He graduated from Cherry Hill High School West where he first started singing and performing in musicals while excelling academically and in track and field as a discus and javelin thrower. Lazar attended Duke University, where he earned a BA magna cum laude, while completing the prerequisite classes for medical school and taking the MCAT. After being accepted as one of only two masters candidates at the elite University of Cincinnati College-Conservatory of Music (CCM), he put plans for being a surgeon on hold, earning an MFA in musical theater before moving to New York City.

Career
Lazar's career spans theater, film, television, concert, cabaret, voice-over, and more recently producing.

Broadway and concerts
Aaron has performed with some of the world's greatest symphonies from the New York Philharmonic to the NYPops at Carnegie Hall to the Kennedy Center, to Masada as both a guest artist and soloist with his own critically acclaimed one man show ‘Broadway to Hollywood’. His voice can be heard on numerous Broadway and off-Broadway cast albums.

Film and television
Currently plays Reverend Paul Luke Thomas on FOX's Gothic Southern drama Filthy Rich.

He played Barry Weissman in the black comedy film This Is Where I Leave You.

References

External links
 Official website
 
 
 
 

Living people
Male actors from New Jersey
American male stage actors
American male film actors
American male television actors
Cherry Hill High School West alumni
Duke University alumni
Jewish American male actors
People from Cherry Hill, New Jersey
University of Cincinnati – College-Conservatory of Music alumni
21st-century American male actors
Year of birth missing (living people)
21st-century American Jews